Patis may refer to:

Paattinen, a Finnish village
Patis, Minas Gerais, a municipality in the Brazilian state of Minas Gerais
Pais, a standard abbreviation for the Buddhist Pali Canon's Patisambhidamagga
 Patis (sauce), a fish sauce used as a cooking ingredient or a condiment in the Philippines
 Patis (plant) , a grass genus in the tribe Stipeae, commonly known as ricegrass